Aleksandr Pavlovich Lapin (born 1 January 1964) is a Russian army officer who was the commander of the Central Military District from 22 November 2017 until 29 October 2022. He was promoted to the rank of colonel general in 2019.

He was the commander of the Army Group "Center" of the Russian Army Forces in the 2022 Russian invasion of Ukraine.

On 10 January 2023, he was appointed Chief of Staff of the Russian Ground Forces.

Biography

Early life and career 
Aleksandr Lapin was born on 1 January 1964 to a working-class family.

After graduating from high school, he studied at the Kazan Chemical–Technological Institute from 1981 to 1982. From 1982 to 1984 he served in the ranks of the Soviet Army in the Soviet Air Defense Forces. After that, he entered the Kazan Higher Tank Command School named after the Presidium of the Supreme Soviet of the Tatar Autonomous Soviet Socialist Republic, from which he graduated in 1988. After graduation, he served as commander of a tank platoon and tank company in the Leningrad Military District and in the Coastal Forces of the Northern Fleet.

High posts 

In 1997, he graduated from the Malinovsky Military Armored Forces Academy. After graduation, he served in the 58th Combined Arms Army as the commander of a separate tank battalion. Since 1999, Lapin was the chief of staff, commander of the 429th Motor Rifle Regiment of the 19th Motor Rifle Division. From 2001 to 2003, he became the Chief of Staff of the 20th Guards Motorized Rifle Carpathian-Berlin Division. From 2003 to 2006, Lapin became the commander of the 205th Motorized Rifle Cossack Brigade and promoted to major general. From 2006 to 2007, he was the commander of the 20th Guards Motor Rifle Division.

In 2009, he graduated from the Military Academy of the General Staff of the Russian Armed Forces. After graduating from the academy, he was deputy commander of the 58th Army.

From April 2012 to July 2014, Lapin commanded the 20th Guards Combined Arms Army. In 2014, he was awarded the military rank of Lieutenant General. From 2014 to 2017, he was the Chief of Staff - First Deputy Commander of the Eastern Military District.

In 2017, Lapin became the chief of staff of the grouping of the Russian troops and forces in Syria. He was promoted to colonel general in 2019. From September to November 2017, Lapin was the Head of the Combined Arms Academy of the Armed Forces of the Russian Federation.

Central Military District 

Lapin was the commander of the Central Military District from 22 November 2017. From October 2018 to January 2019, he was the commander of the grouping of the Russian troops and forces in Syria.

In 2020, he graduated from the faculty of retraining and advanced training of the highest command personnel of the Military Academy of the General Staff.

In June 2022 it was revealed that he was the commander of the Army Group "Center" of the Russian Army Forces in the 2022 Russian invasion of Ukraine. In late March, he visited the front line and awarded a medal to his son, the commander fighting in Sumy and Chernihiv, just before the Russian army withdrew.

Following the Second Battle of Lyman, which saw a Ukrainian victory, Lapin was heavily criticized by the head of the Chechen Republic, Ramzan Kadyrov. Kadyrov blamed Lapin for the Russian retreat, saying he would demote Lapin to the rank of private, strip him of his medals, and send him to the front line barefoot with a light machine gun to "wipe away his shame with blood". The Kremlin told Kadyrov to "set aside emotions" during the "special military operation".

On October 29 Lapin was dismissed as commander from the Central Military District, replaced by Alexander Linkov.

Chief of Staff of the Russian Ground Forces 
On January 10, 2023, Russian media reported that Lapin had been assigned to the post of chief of staff of the Russian Ground Forces.

Family

He is married and has a son, identified by BBC Russia as Lt. Colonel Denis Aleksandrovich Lapin, commanding officer of the 1st Guards Tank Regiment v/ch 58198.

Awards 
 Hero of the Russian Federation
 Order of St. George IV degree (2017)
 Order "For Merit to the Fatherland"
 Order of Alexander Nevsky
 Order of Courage
 Order of Military Merit
 Medal of the Order "For Merit to the Fatherland"
 Medal "For military distinction"
 Medal "To the participant of the military operation in Syria" ;
 Medal "For action in Palmyra"
 Title "Hero of Russia" (Following occupation of Lisichansk)
 Combat Commonwealth Medal (Syria) .

References

1964 births
Living people
Military personnel from Kazan
Russian colonel generals
Soviet military personnel
Heads of military schools
Russian military personnel of the 2022 Russian invasion of Ukraine
Military Academy of the General Staff of the Armed Forces of Russia alumni
Recipients of the Order "For Merit to the Fatherland", 4th class
Recipients of the Order of Courage
Recipients of the Order of Military Merit (Russia)
Recipients of the Medal of the Order "For Merit to the Fatherland" II class
21st-century Russian military personnel